The Ministry of Manpower is the ministry in charge of manpower, labor relations and emigration of Egyptian workers.

Profile
The ministry's headquarters is in Cairo. The Minister of Manpower and Immigration also chairs the higher committee for migration that was established in 1977.

Aside from accounting for workers returning from Gulf states, the agency keeps a list with the names of companies where Egyptian nationals are prohibited to work.

Ministers
In June 2014, Nahed Ashri was assigned the post of minister. In September 2015, Gamal Sorour was assigned to the post.

On 23 March 2016 Mohamed Safaan was appointed Minister of Manpower.

See also

Cabinet of Egypt

References

External links
 Ministry of Manpower official website
Egypt's Cabinet Database

Labour in Egypt
Manpower
Egypt